This is a list of the top-selling singles in New Zealand for 2015 from the Official New Zealand Music Chart's end-of-year chart, compiled by Recorded Music NZ. English singer-songwriter Ed Sheeran, English soul singer Sam Smith, Canadian R&B singer The Weeknd and New Zealand band Six60 each had three songs in the chart. The chart was topped by Mark Ronson featuring Bruno Mars' song "Uptown Funk". As well as the three songs by Six60, the chart also had songs by New Zealand artists Avalanche City and Savage.

Chart 
Key
 – Song of New Zealand origin

Top 20 singles of 2015 by New Zealand artists 

Key
 – Songs that appeared in the Top 50 Chart

Chart by numbers

Origin

By artist
The following shows the country of origin from where the artist (including any featured artist where applicable) originate from. Artists who appear more than once have only been tallied once.

By single
The following shows the country of origin from which the singles originate regardless of who the artist is.

Most singles
The following shows the artists who have the most singles that appear in this chart. This includes where an artist appeared as a featured artist; however where a singer (e.g. Adam Levine) appears as a featured artist on their own and who is usually part of a band/group, this does not count towards their groups (e.g. Maroon 5) tally.

Format
The following show what format each single appears on, whether it was an artists album, a non-album single, an extended play or as part of a soundtrack.

Multiple releases
The following shows singles that had multiple releases from the same album.

Type
The following shows the denomination that each single was released as, whether as a solo artist or as part of a group, band or duo. Also shows how many singles had guest artists.

Top Genre
The following shows the most common genres the Top 50 singles are regarded as (as per their genre descriptions in the singles entries. Where a genre was not noted, the genre of the album/extended play was used instead.

Top Label
The following shows the most common record labels that a single was associated with. Any label that only had one single has not been noted.

Top songwriters
The following shows the songwriters who had the most top-selling singles of 2015 in New Zealand.

Most/Least songwriters
The following shows the singles that were credited as having been written by only one person and the singles that had the most credited writers of 2015.

Top producers
The following shows the producers who had the most singles to appear on this chart.

Notes

References 

 Top Selling NZ Singles of 2015 - Recorded Music NZ

External links 
 The Official NZ Music Chart - singles

2015 in New Zealand music
2015 record charts
Singles 2015